Bowa-ye Olya (also Romanized as Bowā-ye Olyā; also known as Bābā Khāneh, Bovā Kohneh, Bowā-ye Bālā, and Bowā-ye ‘Olīyā) is a village in Dehdasht-e Gharbi Rural District, in the Central District of Kohgiluyeh County, Kohgiluyeh and Boyer-Ahmad Province, Iran. At the 2006 census, its population was 139, in 31 families.

References 

Populated places in Kohgiluyeh County